Mitrofanovka is a rural locality (a selo) in Mikhaylovsky Selsoviet, Duvansky District, Bashkortostan, Russia. The population was 207 as of 2010. There are 4 streets.

Geography 
Mitrofanovka is located 28 km northwest of Mesyagutovo (the district's administrative centre) by road. Yelantub is the nearest rural locality.

References 

Rural localities in Duvansky District